GNC-Alfa is a telecommunications network services operator in Armenia. The company owns a fiber-optic network passing along the Iran–Armenia gas pipeline. GNC-Alfa network is designed to provide wholesale transport network services to fixed and mobile operators and ISPs, as well as transit services via Armenia.

In 2012, Rostelecom acquired 75% minus one share stake in GNC-ALFA via its wholly owned subsidiary, Teleset Networks.

In November 2021 the news broke that 100% of “GNC-Alfa”, held by “Rostelecom” since 2019, has been listed for sale.

References

Telecommunications companies established in 2007
Telecommunications companies of Armenia